The 2010 Leeds City Council election took place on Thursday 6 May 2010 to elect members of Leeds City Council in England. It was held on the same day as the 2010 general election and other local elections across the UK.

As per the election cycle, one third of the council's seats were up for election. The subsequently elected councillors replaced those elected when their individual seats were previously contested in 2006.

The result of the election saw the Labour Party gain five council seats and take minority control of the council. They held 48 of the 99 total seats and negotiated a confidence-and-supply agreement with the two Green Party councillors to achieve a majority. It replaced a six-year coalition between the Liberal Democrats and the Conservatives, which had also been supported by the three Green councillors before the election.

Election result

This result had the following consequences for the total number of seats on the council after the elections:

Councillors who did not stand for re-election

Ward results

By-elections between 2010 and 2011

Notes

References

2010 English local elections
May 2010 events in the United Kingdom
2010
2010s in Leeds